MacFarsi encoding is an obsolete encoding for Farsi/Persian, Urdu (and English) texts that was used in Apple Macintosh computers to texts.

The encoding is identical to MacArabic encoding, except the numerals, which are the Persian/Urdu style, also known as "Extended" or "Eastern" Arabic-Indic numerals. See Arabic script in Unicode for more details.

References

See also
 MacArabic encoding
 Arabic script in Unicode

Character sets
Farsi
Persian alphabets